The William A. Clark House, nicknamed "Clark's Folly", was a mansion located at 962 Fifth Avenue on the northeast corner of its intersection with East 77th Street on the Upper East Side of Manhattan, New York City. It was demolished in 1927 and replaced with a luxury apartment building (960 Fifth Avenue).

History

Construction
William A. Clark, a wealthy entrepreneur and politician from Montana, commissioned the New York City firm of Lord, Hewlett & Hull to build the mansion in 1897. It was completed in 1911, after numerous legal disputes, at a cost of $7 million. The mansion contained 121 rooms, 31 baths, four art galleries, a swimming pool, a concealed garage, and a private underground rail line to bring in coal for heat.

It was reported that Clark bought a quarry in New Hampshire, at a cost of $50,000, and built a railroad to transport the stone for the building. He also bought a bronze foundry employing 200 men to manufacture the bronze fittings. In addition, he imported marble from Italy, oak from Sherwood Forest in England, and parts of old French châteaux for the interior.

The building of the mansion is described in the bestselling biography of Clark's daughter, Huguette, and her family, Empty Mansions: The Mysterious Life of Huguette Clark and the Spending of a Great American Fortune by Bill Dedman and Paul Clark Newell, Jr.

Exterior

The house took up 250 feet on 77th Street and 77 feet on Fifth Avenue, more than any other rich man's mansion on Fifth opposite the park, with the exception of  Andrew Carnegie's.  The Fifth Avenue frontage was large for a New York house, with three bays of granite.

On 77th Street, the house featured a long facade rising to a steep mansard roof. The mansion featured a spectacular four-sided tower with a three-story-high inward-curving arch topped by an open pergola that was said to have been visible from almost anywhere in Central Park.

Interior
The house rose nine stories, with Turkish baths below ground level, laundry rooms on the top floor and many Greek marble columns. There was a Numidian marble fireplace in the banquet room that measured 15 ft. across, with life-size figures of Diana and Neptune. The 121 rooms were filled with medieval tapestries and artwork. In the breakfast room, there were 170 carved panels, with no two being identical.

On the second floor was a rotunda, 36 feet high, of Maryland marble with eight Bresche violet marble columns, used as the statuary room. The room opened onto a conservatory of solid brass and glass, 30 feet high and 22 feet wide. Across the rotunda was the marble-paneled main picture gallery, which was 95 ft. long and two stories high. An organ loft housed the largest chamber organ in America. The Murray M. Harris organ, designed by Arthur Scott Brook, had four manuals (keyboards) and pedalboard, 74 ranks and 71 speaking stops.

The Salon Doré, an ornate 18th-century room taken from the Hotel de Clermont in Paris, was installed in the house and served as the receiving room.

There were 25 guest rooms with their own baths, and 35 servant's rooms, with men’s quarters (to the east) and female rooms (to the west). There was also a Gothic library that was 90 feet long, featuring a beamed ceiling and an immense carved fireplace.

Clark's art collection included works by Eugène Delacroix, Jean-François Millet, Jean-Baptiste-Camille Corot, John Constable, François Boucher and Charles-François Daubigny. It was reported that he spent $200,000 for the Gobelin tapestries owned by Prince Murat and $350,000 for those of the Earl of Coventry.

Demolition
In 1925, upon Clark's death, his widow and his daughter, Huguette Clark, moved to 907 Fifth Avenue, where the annual rental for a full-floor apartment was about $30,000. Shortly thereafter, the mansion was sold to Anthony Campagna for $3 million. He had the home torn down in 1927, less than 20 years after it was built. It was replaced with the current luxury apartment building at 960 Fifth Avenue. The Salon Doré was bequeathed to the Corcoran Gallery of Art in Washington, D.C.

Critical reception
Montgomery Schuyler, in a column titled "Architectural Aberrations" in Architectural Record, stated that the house was “an appropriate residence for the late P. T. Barnum.” He felt the tower was “meaningless and fatuous”; the rounded rustication on the first floor suggested the prototype of “a log house.” At the time, the French style had gone out of fashion and the ornamentation was no longer in vogue. Schuyler wrote that “a certified check to the amount of all this stone carving hung on the outer wall would serve every artistic purpose attained by the carving itself.”

The editor of The Architect called the mansion "The House of a Thousand Cartouches" and despised the "dolorous and ponderous granite" chosen. At the time, these opinions were widespread, earning it the nickname "Clark's Folly".

In 2011, however, The New York Times architectural critic Christopher Gray stated the house was, in fact, "a pretty neat house. If Carrère & Hastings had designed it for an establishment client, its profligacy would certainly have been forgiven, perhaps lionized."

Gallery

See also
William A. Clark
Huguette Clark
Copper King Mansion

References 
Notes

Bibliography
 "The House of Senator Clark: Architectural Aberration No. 21." The Architectural Record, vol. 19, no. 1 (January 1906), pp. 27–29.

External links 

 William A Clark Residence at Beyond the Gilded Age
 William A Clark Residence at The Gilded Age Era

Houses in Manhattan
Fifth Avenue
Upper East Side
William A. Clark family
Demolished buildings and structures in Manhattan
Houses completed in 1907
Buildings and structures demolished in 1927
Gilded Age mansions